This is a list of notable individuals born in Switzerland of Lebanese ancestry or people of Lebanese and Swiss dual nationality who live or lived in Switzerland.

Politics
Jacqueline Badran - member of parliament.

Business
Samir Brikho - businessman (was Chief Executive of Amec Foster Wheeler)
Nicolas Hayek - businessman (former CEO of Swatch)
Mario El-Khoury - businessman (former CEO of CSEM)

Film and television personalities
Jacqui Safra - actor

Music
Lydia Canaan - singer-songwriter
DJ Antoine - DJ

Sciences
Hussein Naim - biochemist

Healthcare
Philip Saliba - Staff Engineer, Source Quality (J&J Consumer Health)

Visual arts
James Karnusian - cartoonist

See also
List of Lebanese people
List of Lebanese people (Diaspora)

Switzerland
Lebanese
Lebanese